Mission Dolores is the oldest neighborhood in San Francisco and therefore its birthplace. It is named after the Spanish Mission Dolores settlement of 1776, and is a sub-area of the much larger Mission District.

References

Neighborhoods in San Francisco